The British Independent Film Award for Best Music is an annual award given by the British Independent Film Awards (BIFA) to recognize the best music in a British independent film. The award was first presented in the 2001 ceremony though it did not become a regular category until 2017.

Prior to 2017, music was awarded as a stand-alone category in 2001 but it was included in the category Best Technical Achievement the next year alongside different areas of crafts in film, this category was presented from 2001 to 2016.

In July 2022, it was announced that the music category would be split into two categories depending on the percentage of original music in the film, Best Original Music for "films in which original score makes up at least 40% of the film’s music soundtrack" and Best Music Supervision for those "in which sourced music makes up at least 40% of the film’s music soundtrack".

Winners and nominees

2000s
 Best Music

 Best Technical Achievement

2010s
 Best Technical Achievement

Best Music

2020s

References

External links
 Official website

British Independent Film Awards